Breezy Bill is a 1930 American western film directed by J.P. McGowan and starring Bob Steele, Edna Aslin and Bud Osborne. It was produced as an independent second feature on Poverty Row.

Cast
 Bob Steele as Breezy Bill
 Edna Aslin as 	Barbara Pennypincher
 Alfred Hewston as Henry Pennypincher
 George Hewston as 	Gabe Pennypincher
 Perry Murdock as 	Gabe's Son
 J.P. McGowan as Sheriff
 Bud Osborne as 	Bandit
 Cliff Lyons as Bandit

References

Bibliography
 Pitts, Michael R. Poverty Row Studios, 1929–1940. McFarland & Company, 2005.

External links
 

1930 films
1930 Western (genre) films
1930s English-language films
American Western (genre) films
Films directed by J. P. McGowan
American black-and-white films
1930s American films